De Jiaojiao (born 5 January 1990, Nei Mongol) is a Chinese field hockey player. At the 2012 Summer Olympics she competed with the China women's national field hockey team in the women's tournament.  She also competed with them at the 2016 Summer Olympics.

She won a silver medal as a member of the Chinese team at 2014 Asian Games, along with gold at the 2010 Games and a bronze at the 2018 Games.

References

External links
 
 
 
 

1990 births
Living people
Chinese female field hockey players
Asian Games medalists in field hockey
Asian Games gold medalists for China
Asian Games silver medalists for China
Asian Games bronze medalists for China
Field hockey players at the 2010 Asian Games
Field hockey players at the 2012 Summer Olympics
Field hockey players at the 2014 Asian Games
Field hockey players at the 2016 Summer Olympics
Field hockey players at the 2018 Asian Games
Medalists at the 2010 Asian Games
Medalists at the 2014 Asian Games
Medalists at the 2018 Asian Games
Olympic field hockey players of China
Sportspeople from Inner Mongolia
21st-century Chinese women